Zagóra  is a village in the administrative district of Gmina Żołynia, within Łańcut County, Podkarpackie Voivodeship, in south-eastern Poland.

References

Villages in Łańcut County